Timmins Victor M. Power Airport  is located  north-northwest of Timmins, Ontario, Canada. The airport serves both scheduled passenger and cargo flights and general aviation, including air ambulance (MEDEVAC), forest-fire fighting, and flight training.

Timmins Airport was first opened in 1955 following lobbying by the board of the Timmins Chamber of Commerce. On May 31, 2007, the airport was renamed in honour of the city's former mayor Victor M. Power.

Airlines and destinations

Timmins Airport handles approximately 150,000 passengers per year, and acts as a mini hub with flights to many small communities in north-central Ontario while connecting these communities to Toronto in the south.

Cargo

Other tenants

 Ontario Ministry of Natural Resources - aerial firefighting unit
 Ornge - air ambulance 
 Budget Car Rental - kiosk inside terminal
 Boogys Diner - inside terminal
 Timmins Ultra-Light School
 Maintair Aviation Services - ground handling services

Timmins Flight Service Station
Timmins Airport is serviced by a flight service station which also provides Remote Airport Advisory Service (RAAS) for the Moosonee (CYMO) and Muskoka (CYQA) airports.

Accidents and incidents
On 9 November 1969, Douglas C-47B CF-AAL of Austin Airways crashed on approach, killing two of the four people on board. The aircraft was operating a domestic flight from Winisk, Ontario.

See also
 Timmins/Porcupine Lake Water Aerodrome

References

External links

Airport website

Transport in Timmins
Certified airports in Cochrane District